Claudine Schaul (born 20 August 1983) is a former tennis player from Luxembourg.

Her career-high rankings are world No. 41 in singles, which was achieved on 24 May 2004, and No. 71 for doubles, achieved on 8 November 2004.

Schaul first played for the Luxembourg Fed Cup team in 1998, where she has a win–loss record of 42–43.

Career
Her father and brother are sports teachers and introduced her to tennis when she was four years old.

A year after turning pro, Schaul made it to the third round of the 2003 US Open, upsetting former No. 15 Anna Smashnova, 7–6(5), 6–2 in the first round.

In January 2004, Schaul won her first doubles title in Canberra, Australia, partnering Jelena Kostanić Tošić. Schaul then made it to the third round of the Australian Open.

In May 2004, she won her first WTA Tour title at Strasbourg, defeating Lindsay Davenport in the final, in three sets.

Due to her strong performances at the Australian Open and Strasbourg, Schaul was awarded the honour of being the flag bearer for Luxembourg at the opening ceremony of the Summer Olympics in Athens.

WTA career finals

Singles: 1 (title)

Doubles: 3 (1 title, 2 runner-ups)

ITF Circuit finals

Singles (4–6)

Doubles (3–4)

References

External links

 
 
 

Luxembourgian female tennis players
1983 births
Living people
Sportspeople from Luxembourg City